Acteon tornatilis, common name the "lathe acteon", is a species of medium-sized sea snail, a predatory marine gastropod mollusc in the family Acteonidae, the barrel bubble snails.

Distribution
This sea snail is present in the Faroes, Shetland, Norway, British coasts, Atlantic coasts of France to the Mediterranean and Marmara Sea.

This is the major representative of the Acteonidae in European waters.

Description

The body size reaches . The basic colour of the shells is pink or pale brown with white bands. The shell is thick, glossy and ridged transversely, with 6-7 large whorls, filled with alternating wider light brown spiral bands and smaller pinkish stripes. The outer lip is white. The shell is elongate and ovate with a sharp apex. The aperture is narrow at the posterior notch but wider at the base. The columella is slightly thickened and twisted.

Habitat
This species lives buried in the sand, in the intertidal zone and to a depth of up to 250 m.

References

 Vaught, K.C. (1989). A classification of the living Mollusca. American Malacologists: Melbourne, FL (USA). . XII, 195 pp.
 Gofas, S.; Le Renard, J.; Bouchet, P. (2001). Mollusca, in: Costello, M.J. et al. (Ed.) (2001). European register of marine species: a check-list of the marine species in Europe and a bibliography of guides to their identification. Collection Patrimoines Naturels, 50: pp. 180–213
 Spencer, H.; Marshall. B. (2009). All Mollusca except Opisthobranchia. In: Gordon, D. (Ed.) (2009). New Zealand Inventory of Biodiversity. Volume One: Kingdom Animalia. 584 pp

External links
Marine Species Identification

Acteonidae
Gastropods described in 1758
Taxa named by Carl Linnaeus